The Palace Embankment or Palace Quay (Russian: Дворцовая набережная, Dvortsovaya naberezhnaya) is a street along the Neva River in Central Saint Petersburg which contains the complex of the Hermitage Museum buildings (including the Winter Palace), the Hermitage Theatre, the New Michael Palace, the Saltykov Mansion and the Summer Garden.

The embankment was wooden up to 1761, when Catherine the Great ordered court architect Yury Felten to build stone embankments. The street as seen nowadays was laid out between 1763 and 1767, when it used to be a preferred place of residence for the Russian Imperial Nobility. The street begins at the Palace Bridge, where the Admiralty Embankment becomes the Palace Embankment, and the street ends at the Fontanka, where it becomes the Kutuzov Embankment.

The Palace Embankment is one of the main places of interest in the city as it offers a wonderful view of the Neva, the Peter and Paul Fortress and Vasilievsky Island.

Notable locations 
 No. 5/1 (Millionnaya st.) — the Marble Palace, built by Antonio Rinaldi for Catherine's favourite Grigory Orlov. Since 1992 the palace is a part of the Russian Museum.
 No. 26 — Grand Duke Vladimir Aleksandrovich palace, 1860s, built by Alexander Rezanov.

Pushkin associations

In his novel Eugene Onegin, Alexander Pushkin depicted himself walking along Palace Quay with his hero, Eugene Onegin:

For the first edition of this chapter, the poet commissioned an illustration depicting him and Onegin walking together along the quay. Upon receiving the illustration, which represented him leaning on a parapet with his back turned towards the Peter and Paul Fortress, he was exceedingly displeased with the result (which had little in common with his own preliminary sketch, illustrated to the right) and scribbled the following epigram underneath (here in translation by Vladimir Nabokov):

References

Sources 

Streets in Saint Petersburg
Odonyms referring to a building
Art gallery districts
1763 establishments in the Russian Empire
Hermitage Museum
Cultural heritage monuments of federal significance in Saint Petersburg